The United Nations Independent Expert on Protection against violence and discrimination based on sexual orientation and gender identity is a United Nations Independent Expert appointed by the United Nations Human Rights Council under its special procedures mechanism. The Independent Expert's mandate is to examine, monitor, advise, and publicly report on matters related to human rights violations based on sexual orientation and gender identity. The mandate was established by Human Rights Council resolution 32/2 (30 June 2016), by a vote of 23 to 18, with 6 abstentions. In June 2019, the Mandate was renewed for another three-year period in a resolution adopted by a vote of 27 to 12 with 7 abstentions during the 41st session of the Human Rights Council in Geneva.

The current Mandate holder is Victor-Madrigal Borloz, who occupies the position since January 2018. The first Independent Expert to be appointed was Vitit Muntarbhorn, who held the Mandate from August 2016 to October 2017.

in July 2022, the United Nations Human Rights Council adopted the resolution to extend the term of the independent expert on SOGI for another three years. The resolution was adopted with 23 votes in favour, 17 against and 7 abstaining from vote.

References

Submitting for review 

United Nations Human Rights Council